Opisina is a monotypic moth genus in the family Xyloryctidae described by Francis Walker in 1864. Its only species, Opisina arenosella, the coconut black-headed caterpillar, was described by the same author in the same year. It is found in India, Sri Lanka, Bangladesh and Myanmar.

Adults are grey.

The larvae are gregarious and are serious pests of coconut trees. They defoliate their host plant.

References

Xyloryctidae
Moths described in 1864
Monotypic moth genera
Xyloryctidae genera